Postplatyptilia ugartei is a moth of the family Pterophoridae. It is known from Chile.

The wingspan is 19–21 mm. Adults are on wing in January.

Etymology
The species is named after its collector, Ing. Alfredo Ugarte Peña, who is very active in the research of the fauna of Chile.

References

ugartei
Moths described in 1991
Endemic fauna of Chile